"How Love Begins" is a single by English drum and bass producer DJ Fresh and Welsh drum and bass DJ and producer High Contrast featuring vocals from English rapper, songwriter, singer, and record producer Dizzee Rascal and uncredited vocals from Clare Maguire. The song was released as a digital download on 5 February 2016 through Ministry of Sound as the seventh single from Fresh's forthcoming fourth studio album. The song peaked at number 53 on the UK Singles Chart. The song was written by Dizzee Rascal, Dan Stein, Clare Maguire and Lincoln J. Barrett.

Music video
A music video to accompany the release of "How Love Begins" was first released onto YouTube on 23 December 2015 at a total length of three minutes and nineteen seconds. The video pays homage to 1980s workout videos featuring the dancers appearing in the video that is shown on television and throughout in various places (during a family dinner, a crime scene, a police station, a courtroom, a jail, and a bar). A blue haired woman watches the dancers at the beginning then shows up at the bar at the end of the song. Dizzee Rascal appears as a news presenter. The music video was directed by Scott Cudmore

Track listing

Chart performance

Weekly charts

Release history

References

2016 songs
2016 singles
DJ Fresh songs
Songs written by Dizzee Rascal
Song recordings produced by DJ Fresh
Songs written by DJ Fresh
Songs written by Clare Maguire